

















Lists of country codes